Cicerones de Buenos Aires is the name of a non-profit organization that provides free guided tours and travel information to visitors of the city of Buenos Aires, Argentina. Founded in May 2001 by residents of Buenos Aires, the organization's mission is to improve the image of the city though its services.

Origin of name 
Cicerones is derived from the term cicerone, meaning tour guide. Members of Cicerones de Buenos Aires are trained, multilingual volunteer tour guides.

Operations 
Visitors to the city can contact the organization to schedule a free tour with a guide at a place and time of the visitor's choosing. The guide can also suggest unique, less-traveled sites to visit.

References

Cicerones de Buenos Aires Cicerones de Buenos Aires

External links 
Cicerones de Buenos Aires Official site: Cicerones de Buenos Aires

Buenos Aires
Tourism in Argentina
Non-profit organisations based in Argentina